The 1935–36 season was the 27th in the history of the Isthmian League, an English football competition.

Wimbledon were champions for the second time in a row, winning fourth Isthmian League title.

League table

References

Isthmian League seasons
I